Hiko Springs, also spelled Hyko Springs, is a natural spring located at the farming community of Hiko, in Lincoln County, eastern Nevada, United States. Its cool water flowing from the hillside spring supports the existence of the desert community.

It also supplies irrigation water for valley farms there, and for riparian habitats in the Key Pittman Wildlife Management Area. It fills the small Nesbitt Lake and Frenchie Lake within the Nevada state wildlife preserve.

See also
Hiko Range

Springs of Nevada
Bodies of water of Lincoln County, Nevada